The Liverpool pound refers to various types of local currencies used in Liverpool, United Kingdom.

History
Between 1793 and 1796, in order to solve a local financial crisis the Liverpool Corporation gained permission from the House of Commons to distribute its own banknotes in denominations of £50 and £100. Today versions of the original notes are displayed at the Liverpool Museum.

In 2017 Israeli technology company Colu launched the Liverpool Local Pound, a digital currency accessible through a smartphone app and which offers discounts at businesses in Liverpool.

References

External links

Liverpool Local Pound

Local currencies of the United Kingdom

New Liverpool Pound